John Khabonina Zondo (born 24 December 1961) is a South African association football coach.

He managed Royal Eagles from 2015 to 2016, and Royal AM from 2022.

His previous clubs include Bloemfontein Celtic, Golden Arrows and Classic FC.

He also worked as an assistant coach for Bafana Bafana.

References

1961 births
Living people
South African soccer managers
Lamontville Golden Arrows F.C. managers